Fort Worth FC is an American women’s soccer team, founded in 1997. The team is a member of the Women's Premier Soccer League, the third tier of women’s soccer in the United States and Canada. The team plays in the South Division of the Big Sky Conference.

The team plays its home games in the stadium on the campus of Nolan Catholic High School in Fort Worth, Texas. The team's colors are red, white and black.

Players

Current roster

Notable former players
The following former players have played at the senior international and/or professional level:
  Charmaine Hooper

Year-by-year

Honors

Competition History

Coaches
  Tarik Guendouzi 2008–present
  Austin Hudson 2008–present

Stadia
 Stadium at Nolan Catholic High School, Fort Worth, Texas 2008–present

Average Attendance

External links
 Official Site
 WPSL Fort Worth FC page

Women's Premier Soccer League teams
Women's soccer clubs in the United States
Soccer clubs in Texas
2007 establishments in Texas
Women's sports in Texas